The 1990 Orkney Islands Council election, the sixth election to Orkney Islands Council, was held on 3 May 1990 as part of the wider 1990 Scottish regional elections. The election saw the Independents take all save one of the seats on the council, securing them an overall majority.

Results

Ward Results

Notes

References

Orkney
Orkney Islands Council elections